The House Place Plantation was a small cotton plantation of  located in central Leon County, Florida, United States established by R.A. Whitfield.

Location 
The House Place bordered the James Kirksey Plantation on the west and the large La Grange Plantation on the south and east. Today the land northeast of Fleischmann Road and between Miccosukee Road and Centervillle Road. In the twentieth century, House Place and other cotton plantations became Welaunee Plantation, used for quail hunting.

Plantation Specifics
The Leon County Florida 1860 Agricultural Census shows that Pine Hill Plantation had the following:
 Improved Land: 
 Unimproved Land: 
 Cash value of plantation: $16,600
 Cash value of farm implements/machinery: $500
 Cash value of farm animals: $2170
 Number of persons enslaved: 47
 Bushles of corn: 3000
 Bales of cotton: 216

The House Place would be purchased by Udo Fleishmann later on and become Welaunee Plantation.

References
Rootsweb Plantations
Largest Slaveholders from 1860 Slave Census Schedules
Paisley, Clifton; From Cotton To Quail, University of Florida Press, c1968.

House Place Plantation
Whitfield family residences
Cotton plantations in Florida